Bloody Margaret is a variation on the cocktail Bloody Mary, made with gin instead of vodka - known as a Red Snapper in the United States.

History
According to web site FoodRepublic.com, the Red Snapper originated in post-Prohibition New York City. A French barman named Fernand “Pete” Petiot left Harry's New York Bar in Paris to work at the King Cole Room at the St. Regis Hotel in NYC. Petiot had been known in Paris for the tomato juice and vodka drink the Bloody Mary, which was reportedly named after a customer.  Vodka was hard to come by in New York so Petiot swapped it out with Gin.  The Astors, owners of the St. Regis, didn't like the name Bloody Mary and so Red Snapper was chosen instead.

See also
 List of cocktails
 Queen Mary (cocktail)

References 

Cocktails with gin
Cocktails with tomato juice